Caularis is a genus of moths of the family Noctuidae.

Species
 Caularis jamaicensis Todd, 1966
 Caularis lunata Hampson, 1904
 Caularis undulans Walker, [1858]

References
 Caularis at Markku Savela's Lepidoptera and Some Other Life Forms
 Natural History Museum Lepidoptera genus database

Agaristinae
Noctuoidea genera